XHCHA-FM is a radio station in Chihuahua City, Chihuahua, Mexico. Broadcasting on 104.5 FM, XHCHA is owned by Multimedios Radio and carries its La Lupe Spanish variety hits format.

History
XHCHA was made available for commercial use on December 5, 1989, with a maximum ERP of 50 kilowatts. Bidders for the station included Joaquín Vargas Gómez of MVS Radio and Francisco Aguirre Gómez of Grupo Radio México. In 1990, the government declared Radio Espectacular the winner of the station; the concession was awarded in 1993.

The station has been owned by Multimedios for its entire history. Previous formats on XHCHA include Radio Recuerdo and Stereo Hits (which became Hits FM).

On January 17, 2020, Multimedios Radio flipped XHCHA to its La Lupe variety hits format, and Hits FM moved to XHHEM-FM, leading to the end of Classic.

References

Radio stations in Chihuahua
Mass media in Chihuahua City
Radio stations established in 1993
1993 establishments in Mexico
Multimedios Radio
Spanish-language radio stations